Kalonymus Haberkasten was a rabbi and Talmudist in sixteenth century Poland. He is well known as the rosh yeshiva of many great rabbis including Rabbi Solomon Luria, who married his daughter Lipka.

Haberkasten was rosh yeshiva in Lviv, and was later the first rabbi of the city of Ostroh, Volhynia. He left Ostroh to assume the position of rosh yeshiva in Brest and Luria succeeded him in Ostroh. Haberkasten then went to Eretz Yisroel/Ottoman Syria, in about 1560.

Haberkasten was also a Kabbalist and was known to have made the acquaintance of the great Kabbalists in the Holy Land, including Rabbi Chaim Vital.

References 
 

16th-century rabbis from the Ottoman Empire
16th-century Polish rabbis
Ashkenazi rabbis in Ottoman Palestine
Polish emigrants to the Ottoman Empire
Rosh yeshivas
Kabbalists
Talmudists
Year of death unknown
Year of birth unknown